Ochirdolgoryn Enkhtaivan (born 28 February 1952) is a Mongolian wrestler. He competed in the men's Greco-Roman 48 kg at the 1972 Summer Olympics.

References

External links
 

1952 births
Living people
Mongolian male sport wrestlers
Olympic wrestlers of Mongolia
Wrestlers at the 1972 Summer Olympics
Place of birth missing (living people)
Asian Games bronze medalists for Mongolia
Asian Games medalists in wrestling
Wrestlers at the 1974 Asian Games
Medalists at the 1974 Asian Games
Universiade medalists in wrestling
Universiade bronze medalists for Mongolia
Medalists at the 1977 Summer Universiade
21st-century Mongolian people
20th-century Mongolian people